The School of Law of City University of Hong Kong was founded in 1987, as the second law school in Hong Kong.

History
The Department of Law was established in 1987, followed by the Department of Professional Legal Education in 1992. In March 1993, the two departments were brought together to merge as the Faculty of Law, and later renamed as the School of Law since the administrations of the two departments were unified.

The school publishes Asia Pacific Law Review since 1992 and a student-edited City University of Hong Kong Law Review since 2009. The school also has participated in various mooting competitions, having won moots such as ICC Moot and Vis East in 2012, and Willem C. Vis Moot in 2013.

Notable alumni
 Rimsky Yuen SC, former Secretary for Justice
 Hectar Pun SC, Senior Counsel. 
 Eunice Yung, Member of the 6th Legislative Council of Hong Kong
 Paul Tse, Member of the 4th Legislative Council of Hong Kong
 Richard Khaw SC, Recorder of the Court of First Instance of the High Court

Notable professors

 Priscilla Leung, expert in Chinese law and constitutional law, member of the Legislative Council of Hong Kong

Programmes offered
The school offers law degree programs at both the undergraduate and postgraduate levels. Unlike most other common law jurisdictions, both the LLB and the JD operate concurrently in Hong Kong, providing for entry to the legal profession through an undergraduate or postgraduate path.

Undergraduate
The school offers a full-time four-year Bachelor of Laws (LL.B.) Programme. The degree offers students a general and professional education at the undergraduate level. The School of Law in 2007 launched the Global Legal Education and Awareness Project (G-LEAP). Under G-LEAP, students can opt to study credit-bearing law course during summer term at Faculty of Law of Monash University and University College, Oxford.

Postgraduate
The school offers multiple Postgraduate programs. While J.D. programme is the graduate route in Hong Kong, P.C.LL. is required for admission to the profession. It has established the GLOBAL GATEWAY Programme to provide multi-jurisdictional opportunities for legal study to postgraduate students. This programme offers students the possibility of exchange programme and dual LLM degree from other leading international law schools such as Europe-Asia Research Institute of Aix-Marseille University, University Paris 1 Panthéon-Sorbonne in France, and Université de Fribourg in Switzerland.
 Juris Doctor (J.D.) Programme
 Master of Laws (LL.M.) Programme
 Master of Laws (Renmin University of China) (LL.M.) Programme, in Chinese Law, degree granted by Renmin University of China
Master of Laws in Arbitration & Dispute Resolution (LLMArbDR) Programme
Master of Philosophy in Laws (M.Phil.) Programme
Doctor of Philosophy in Laws (Ph.D.) Programme
Doctor of Juridical Science (J.S.D.) Programme
 Postgraduate Certificate in Laws (P.C.LL.)

Ranking

TIMES World University Subject Rankings (Law)

QS World University Subject Rankings (Top 200)

External links
 School of Law - City University of Hong Kong

References

Law schools in Hong Kong
City University of Hong Kong